Roy Bjørnstad (September 29, 1925 – November 25, 2005) was a Norwegian actor.

Bjørnstad made his debut in 1945 at the People's Theater in Sweden. Throughout his career, he was associated with several theaters in Norway, including the Trøndelag Theater from 1949 to 1951, the Rogaland Theater from 1953 to 1960, and then several periods with NRK's Television Theater in the 1960s and 1970s. From 1978 to 1996 he was engaged with the Norwegian Theater. He made a name for himself there in a number of Chekhov productions, such as Three Sisters (1981) and The Seagull (1987). He also made an impression in Cora Sandel's Kjøp ikke Dondi (Don't Buy Dondi) and Kido Okamoto's Heikegani (The Heike Crabs).

In 1946, Bjørnstad made his film debut in Englandsfarere. Other films that he appeared in include Jentespranget, Trost i taklampa, Den siste Fleksnes, and Olsenbanden gir seg aldri. Bjørnstad also had some television roles outside of his Television Theater productions, including in a few episodes of the comedy series Fleksnes Fataliteter as well as in the crime series Nini (2001) and Blind gudinne (1997).

Filmography

Films

 Englandsfarere (1946) as Arne
 Dei svarte hestane (1951) as Falte
 Trost i taklampa (1955) as Roy
 Freske fraspark (1963) 
 Om Tilla (1963) 
 Marenco (1964) 
 Sult (1966) as Konstantin
 Bare et liv – Historien om Fridtjof Nansen (1968) 
 An-Magritt (1969) as Lort-Nils, an ore transporter
 Operasjon V for vanvidd (1970) as Mørk
 One Day in the Life of Ivan Denisovich (1970)
 Lukket avdeling (1972) as Vestfold
 The Call of the Wild (1972) as Storeman
 Jentespranget (1973) as Gilbert
 Bobbys krig (1974) as Robert Lund
 Kimen (1974) as Jens
 Den siste Fleksnes (1974) as a policeman
 Karjolsteinen (1977) as the party chairman
 Operasjon Cobra (1978) as Fredrik's father
 Rallarblod (1979) as Slag-Peder
 Olsenbanden gir seg aldri (1981) as passport control officer
 Krypskyttere (1982) as Olaf Buer
 Buicken – store gutter gråter ikke (1991) as Arntzen

Television

 Kontorsjef Tangen (1966)
 Fleksnes Fataliteter: Trafikk og panikk (1974) as a policeman
 Fleksnes Fataliteter: Radioten (1976) as Bud
 Saken Ruth Vang (1981) as William Hagenberg 
 I de beste familier (1994) as Jack 
 Blind gudinne (1997) (mini-series) as Thomassen
 Nini (2001) as Will

NRK Television Theater

 Ungen (1960) as Julius
 Den store barnedåpen  (1961) as Hans "Gjøken" 
 Fru Inger til Østråt (1961) as Ejner Huk 
 Går ut i kveld (1961) as Gidney 
 Nederlaget (1966)  as Louis 
 Huset på grensen (1969)  as a smuggler 
 Twigs (1978) as Frank

References

External links
 
 Roy Bjørnstad at Filmfront
 Roy Bjørnstad at the Swedish Film Database

1925 births
2005 deaths
20th-century Norwegian male actors
Male actors from Oslo